Robert Henley Myers (29 November 1930 – 18 March 2020) was an Australian rules footballer who played with St Kilda in the Victorian Football League (VFL).

Notes

External links 

2020 deaths
1930 births
Australian rules footballers from Victoria (Australia)
St Kilda Football Club players